The Rhynchocystinae are a subfamily of parasites in the phylum Apicomplexa.

Taxonomy

There are three genera in this subfamily: Dirhynchocystis, Grayallia and Rhynchocystis.

History

This subfamily was created by Bhatia and Stena in 1939.

Description

References

Bikont subfamilies
Conoidasida